Emilio Molíns y Lemaur (February 3, 1824 – March 27, 1889) was a former military officer of rank lance corporal of Spanish army in the Philippines. From March 10 to April 7, 1883, he temporarily served as the 102nd governor and captain-general of the Philippines after the reappointment of Fernándo Primo de Rivera. He was succeeded by Joaquín Jovellar, and thereafter came back into office  again as ad interim 104th governor and captain-general from April 1 to April 4, 1885.

References

1824 births
1889 deaths
Spanish generals
Captains General of the Philippines